The 2016 Oregon Ducks football team represented the University of Oregon in the 2016 NCAA Division I FBS football season. The team was led by fourth-year head coach Mark Helfrich and played their home games at Autzen Stadium for the 50th straight year. They were a member of the Pac-12 Conference in the North Division.

They finished the season 4–8, 2–7 in Pac-12 play to finish in last place in the North Division.  On November 29, Helfrich and Oregon agreed to part ways. He finished at Oregon with a four year record of 37–16.

Schedule

Source:

Personnel

Rankings

Game summaries

UC Davis

Virginia

at Nebraska

Colorado

at Washington State

Washington

at California

Arizona State

at USC

Stanford

at Utah

at Oregon State

References

Oregon
Oregon Ducks football seasons
Oregon Ducks football